The Overworked American: The Unexpected Decline of Leisure is a 1992 book by labor economist Juliet Schor on the increase of American working hours in the late 20th century.

Bibliography

External links 

 
 Full text from the Internet Archive

1992 non-fiction books
English-language books
Books about labour
Basic Books books
Labor in the United States
Books by Juliet Schor